Stewart Madzayo is a Kenyan politician. He is the current senator representing Kilifi County.

References 

Living people
Members of the Senate of Kenya
Year of birth missing (living people)